A cappella is an adjective that means unaccompanied singing.

Acappella or variation, may also refer to:

Music
A Capella, composition for choir by Morton Gould

Artists
 Acappella (group), an all-male contemporary Christian vocal group

Albums
 A Cappella (Gaither Vocal Band album), 2003
 A Cappella (Todd Rundgren album), 1985
 Acappella, 1994, by Johnny Maestro & The Brooklyn Bridge

Songs
 "Acapella" (Karmin song), 2013
 "Acapella" (Kelis song), 2010
 "A capella" (Ylvis song), 2016
"A Capella", song by Israel Vibration U-Roy from Serious Matter 2000

Other uses
 Acapella (trimaran), a boat
 Acapela, a company which develops text-to-speech software and services
 A Capela, a municipality in province of A Coruña in the autonomous community of Galicia in north-western Spain

See also

 Lists of a cappella groups
 Capella (disambiguation)
 Cappella (disambiguation)

 Capela (disambiguation)